Nevers is a railway station in Nevers, Bourgogne-Franche-Comté, France. The station opened on 5 October 1850 and is located on the Moret-Lyon, Vierzon - Saincaize, Nevers - Chagny and Clamecy - Nevers railway lines. The station is served by Intercités (long distance) and TER (local) services operated by SNCF.

To the North of the station is the large Nevers Works and Nevers Depot where many trains are maintained, overhauled etc. Also at the rear of the station are a few sidings where freight and passenger trains are kept.

Train services

The station is served by intercity and regional trains towards Cosne-sur-Loire, Moulins, Clermont-Ferrand, Lyon, Dijon, Orléans and Paris.

Gallery

References

External links
 Photo of trains at Nevers
 Photo

Railway stations in Nièvre
Railway stations in France opened in 1850
Nevers